Adoor Govindankutty is an Indian television anchor, actor, scriptwriter, ad film and cine director, in Malayalam movies. He stepped into the media industry in 2001 through 'Students Only' chat show by Kairali TV. Govindankutty's first commercial movie was Anandabhadram, released in the year 2005.

Television Anchor 
As an anchor, Govindankutty was the main attraction of 'Students Only' campus show in Kairali TV since its inception, which was billed as the most popular campus-based programme on Malayalam television. He hosted more than 800 episodes of Students Only show spanned 8 years. He bagged the award from Fraternity for Arts and Media Entertainment (FRAME) in the year 2009 for best compere(Students Only on Kairali TV). Later he moved to New York City and done advanced studies at New York Film Academy and California  In 2020, he made a comeback to television hosting a reality show Flowers student startup in association with Flowers (TV channel).

Film career 
In 2005, he debuted his acting career through the movie Anandabhadram. Later in 2010, he directed 3 Char Sau Bees which was his debut as a director and scriptwriter. Govindankutty done a major role in the movie Spirit directed by Ranjith in 2012.

Filmography

References

Indian male film actors
Male actors in Malayalam cinema
Male actors from Pathanamthitta
21st-century Indian male actors
Living people
Year of birth missing (living people)